Chase Louis De Jong (born December 29, 1993) is an American professional baseball pitcher for the Pittsburgh Pirates of Major League Baseball (MLB). De Jong was drafted by the Toronto Blue Jays in the 2nd round of the 2012 Major League Baseball draft. He made his MLB debut in 2017. He has played in MLB for the Seattle Mariners, Minnesota Twins, Houston Astros and Pirates.  He throws a fastball, cut fastball, slider, curve, and change-up.

Career

Toronto Blue Jays
De Jong was drafted by the Toronto Blue Jays out of Woodrow Wilson High School in Long Beach, California in the second round of the 2012 Major League Baseball draft. After signing for a bonus of $620,300, De Jong was assigned to the Gulf Coast League Blue Jays and made 6 relief appearances for the team, posting a 1–0 record with a 1.50 earned run average and 15 strikeouts over 12 innings, with only 1 walk. He was promoted to the Bluefield Blue Jays prior to the start of the 2013 season, and made 13 appearances for the team, 10 of which were starts. In 2013, De Jong posted a 2–3 record with an ERA of 3.05 and 66 strikeouts over 56 innings pitched. In 2014, he was promoted to the Class-A Lansing Lugnuts. De Jong made 23 appearances for Lansing in 2014, 21 of which were starts, and compiled a record of 1–6 with a 4.82 ERA and 73 strikeouts in 97 innings pitched. De Jong started the 2015 season in Lansing, making 14 starts and posting a 7–4 record, 3.13 ERA, and 77 strikeouts in  innings.

Los Angeles Dodgers
DeJong was traded to the Los Angeles Dodgers on July 2, 2015, for cash. In 11 appearances (10 starts) for the Rancho Cucamonga Quakes he was 4–3 with a 4.86 ERA. He struck out six in six innings for the Quakes in the opening game of the California League championship series. The Dodgers invited him to major league spring training in 2016. To start the 2016 season, he was promoted to the Double-A Tulsa Drillers of the Texas League, where he was selected to the mid-season all-star team. In Tulsa, he developed a cut fastball under the tutelage of pitching coatch Bill Simas. After the season, he was named to the postseason all-star team and honored as the Texas League Pitcher of the Year. In 25 starts for the Drillers he was 14–5 with a 2.86 ERA, earning him a late season promotion to the Triple-A Oklahoma City Dodgers, where he allowed one run in  innings in his one start. The Dodgers added him to their 40-man roster after the season.

Seattle Mariners
On March 1, 2017, he was traded to the Seattle Mariners in exchange for minor leaguers Drew Jackson and Aneurys Zabala. The Mariners added him to the major league roster on April 3, 2017. He made his major league debut against the Houston Astros at Minute Maid Park in Houston on April 5, 2017, gaining the loss by giving up a three-run home run to George Springer in bottom of the 13th inning in the Astros' 5–3 victory over the Mariners. After the game, De Jong was optioned to the Tacoma Rainiers of the Pacific Coast League after the Mariners activated Dillon Overton from the paternity list.

Minnesota Twins
On July 30, 2018, De Jong was traded to the Minnesota Twins along with infielder Ryan Costello for pitcher Zach Duke. He was called up in September of that year. On January 30, 2019, De Jong was designated for assignment after the signing of Martin Perez was made official. He was outrighted on February 6. DeJong had his contract selected on April 6, 2019. After a game against the Mets where he gave up 4 earned runs, 1 home run, and 3 walks in 1 inning pitched, he was sent back down to Triple-A Rochester. DeJong was outrighted off the roster on April 26, 2019.

Sugar Land Skeeters
On July 22, 2019, De Jong signed with the Sugar Land Skeeters of the Atlantic League of Professional Baseball. He became a free agent following the season. On April 1, 2020, De Jong re-signed with the Skeeters for the 2020 season.

Houston Astros
On August 3, 2020, the Houston Astros acquired the rights to De Jong from the Sugar Land Skeeters. On August 23, 2020, De Jong was selected to the active roster. In 3 appearances for the Astros, De Jong struggled to a 14.73 ERA. On October 30, De Jong elected free agency.

Pittsburgh Pirates
On January 5, 2021, De Jong signed a minor league contract with the Pittsburgh Pirates organization. On May 30, De Jong was selected to the active roster. He made his season debut as the Pirates’ starting pitcher against the Colorado Rockies, going 5.0 innings while only allowing 1 run. De Jong was placed on the injured list with left knee inflammation on July 20 after being hit in the knee by a line drive off the bat of Arizona Diamondbacks outfielder David Peralta. On July 28, De Jong underwent season-ending surgery on the injury. On November 5, 2021, De Jong was outrighted off of the 40-man roster and elected free agency the next day.

On March 16, 2022, De Jong signed a minor league contract to return to the Pirates. Assigned to the Indianapolis Indians of the Class AAA International League, he combined with Austin Brice and Yerry De Los Santos to throw a no-hitter. On April 22, the Pirates selected De Jong's contract.

Personal life
On December 1, 2018, De Jong married Christina Langer, daughter of golfer Bernhard Langer.

He is the cousin of former Blue Jays pitcher Jordan De Jong.

References

External links

1993 births
Living people
Baseball players from Long Beach, California
Wilson Classical High School alumni
Major League Baseball pitchers
Seattle Mariners players
Minnesota Twins players
Houston Astros players
Pittsburgh Pirates players
Gulf Coast Blue Jays players
Bluefield Blue Jays players
Lansing Lugnuts players
Rancho Cucamonga Quakes players
Tulsa Drillers players
Oklahoma City Dodgers players
Tacoma Rainiers players
Arkansas Travelers players
Rochester Red Wings players
Sugar Land Skeeters players
Indianapolis Indians players